Bunk Not Dead is the second album released by Bunkface, a Malaysian punk rock band. It was produced by their own 'Bunkface Productions'. The album was released on 17 July 2012 in Malaysia. Bunk Not Dead consists of 9 English songs and 4 Malay songs, including their hit singles "Panik", "Jatuh" and "More".

This album took two years to complete due to hectic touring schedules. The first single, "Panik", was recorded entirely in Jakarta and Indonesia with an estimated cost of RM16,000. For the remaining songs, they were recorded in Iseek Music Studio, located in Kota Damansara. Mixing of the album was done by 'Mas Henk' of Palu Studio from Jakarta, Indonesia, while the Mastering process was handled by Tom Waltz of 'Tom Waltz Mastering' from USA.

In Bunk Not Dead, Bunkface showed musical maturity, with deeper lyrics and heavier music than their previous works . This album presents a sense and expression of anger from Bunkface to the world around them, especially their nation's music industry, which has been discriminating the local punk rock music scene.

Bunkface have made a joint venture with Hunter Interactive Worldwide. Bhd. which made the album the first to use the Augmented Reality technology. AR album is an album that contains hidden code behind images allows the graphics in the album is moving when viewed through an Android phone or an iPhone. But it is only available in limited edition copies
While still working with Indigital Music Sdn Bhd (digital), Bunkface also used the services of Warner Music Malaysia to help in the distribution of the album throughout Malaysia

Track listing

Personnel
 Sam - Vocals, guitar
 Paan - Guitar, backing vocals
 Youk - Bass, backing vocals
 Ijam Coda - Drums
 Wawa - Keyboards and synths
 Ajam - Keyboards and synths
 Genervie Kam Shi Ling - Piano on "Jatuh"
 Mas Henk(Pak Hiro)- Mixing
 Tom Waltz - Mastering

External links
 https://archive.today/20121130010719/http://artisselebritipanas.blogspot.com/2012/07/kemarahan-bunkface.html
 
 https://web.archive.org/web/20120727015323/http://www.utusan.com.my/utusan/Hiburan/20120725/hi_01/Perjuangan-belum-tamat

2012 albums
Bunkface albums
Malay-language albums